Dholpur–Sarmathura Railway is a  narrow-gauge railway in Dholpur. It was built by Dholpur State during British India. The route length from Sarmathura to Dholpur is 72 km and from Dholpur to Tantpur is 60 km. Mohari is a Junction Station in Dholpur-Sarmathura Line from where the trains for Tantpur is boarded by passengers.

History 
Dholpur–Sarmathura Railway was sanctioned by the then Maharaja Ram Singh of the Dholpur State on 14 December 1905 and formally opened in February 1908. The original name of the company was Dholpur-Bari Light Railway. It was renamed the Dholpur State Railway in 1914.

The rail initially used steam locomotives, but later diesel locomotives are used. There is only one rake/train which covers to trips per day in this section. Its first trip begins in early morning at around 04:00 hrs and returns at 10:15 hrs. The second trip begins at 10:40 hrs. and ends at around 19:00 hrs. There are many halt stations in this section.

Rolling stock
In 1936, the company owned six locomotives, eight coaches and 126 goods wagons.

Classification
It was labeled as a Class III railway according to Indian Railway Classification System of 1926.

Conversion to broad gauge 
The gauge conversion work of this section was started in around year 2010 but could not be completed and stopped due to political reasons. The Railways' plan was to connect the railway to Gangapur via Karauli. which could be an alternate route also for connecting the Jhansi and Gangapur.

Railway Administration 
This section is under the control of Assistant Divisional Engineer of North Central Railway who is headquartered at Dholpur. He is assisted by a Permanent Way Supervisor and Works Supervisor. All maintenance of all the track and works comes under administrative control. Generally a Group-'A' officer of Engineering Services Examination is posted at this post.

The tenures of Various Officers as Assistant Divisional Engineer in Dholpur is as given below:

References

External links 

2 ft 6 in gauge railways in India
Defunct railway companies of India
Railway lines opened in 1908
Rail transport in Rajasthan